The Roman Catholic Archdiocese of Vitória is an archdiocese located in the city of Vitória in Brazil.

History
 15 November 1895: Established as Diocese of Espírito Santo from the Diocese of Niterói
 16 February 1958: Promoted as Metropolitan Archdiocese of Vitória

Bishops

Ordinaries, in reverse chronological order
 Archbishops of Vitória, below
 Archbishop Dario Campos, O.F.M. (2018.11.07 – present)
 Archbishop Luiz Mancilha Vilela, SS.CC. (2004.04.14 – 2018.11.07)
 Archbishop Silvestre Luís Scandián, S.V.D. (1984.04.27 – 2004.04.14)
 Archbishop João Batista da Mota e Albuquerque (1958.05.26 – 1984.04.27)
 Archbishop João Batista da Mota e Albuquerque (1957.04.29 – 1958.05.26)
 Bishops of Espírito Santo, below
 Bishop José Joaquim Gonçalves (1951.12.15 – 1957.03.14), appointed Auxiliary Bishop of Rio Preto, São Paulo
 Bishop Luiz Scortegagna (1933.07.28 – 1951.12.01)
 Bishop Benedito Paulo Alves de Souza (1918.01.28 – 1933.07.28)
 Bishop Fernando de Souza Monteiro, C.M. (1901.08.21 – 1916.03.23)
 Bishop João Batista Corrêa Nery (1896.08.29 – 1901.05.18), appointed Bishop of Pouso Alegre

Coadjutor bishops
Luiz Scortegagna (1932-1933)
Silvestre Luís Scandián, S.V.D. (1981-1984)
Luiz Mancilha Vilela, SS.CC. (2002-2004)

Auxiliary bishops
José Joaquim Gonçalves (1951), appointed Bishop here
Luís Gonzaga Fernandes (1955-1981), appointed Bishop of Campina Grande, Paraiba
Geraldo Lyrio Rocha (1984-1990), appointed Bishop of Colatina, Espirito Santo
João Braz de Aviz (1994-1998), appointed Bishop of Ponta Grossa, Parana; future Cardinal
Odilon Guimarães Moreira (1999-2003), appointed Bishop of Itabira-Fabriciano, Minas Gerais
Hélio Adelar Rubert (1999-2004), appointed Bishop of Santa Maria, Rio Grande do Sul
Mário Marquez, O.F.M. Cap. (2006-2010), appointed Bishop of Joaçaba, Santa Catarina
José Aparecido Hergesse, C.R. (2011); did not take effect
Joaquim Wladimir Lopes Dias (2011-2015), appointed Bishop of Colatina, Espirito Santo
Rubens Sevilha, O.C.D. (2011-2018), appointed Bishop of Bauru, São Paulo

Other priest of this diocese who became bishop
Joaquim Mamede da Silva Leite, appointed Auxiliary Bishop of Campinas in 1916

Suffragan dioceses
 Diocese of Cachoeiro de Itapemirim 
 Diocese of Colatina
 Diocese of São Mateus

Churches

 Our Lady of Victory Cathedral, Vitória

References

Sources
 GCatholic.org
 Catholic Hierarchy
  Archdiocese website (Portuguese)
 

Roman Catholic dioceses in Brazil
Roman Catholic ecclesiastical provinces in Brazil
 
Religious organizations established in 1895
Roman Catholic dioceses and prelatures established in the 19th century
1895 establishments in Brazil